Narine Arakelian (born 13 May 1979) is an Armenian interdisciplinary feminist artist; she works with Performance art, Installation art, Painting, Sculpture, Video art and Environmental art combining Fine Arts and Digital Technologies by using the custom designed Artificial Intelligence (A.I.). The artist creates artworks based on social, cultural and political issues focusing predominantly on social justice and gender identity.

Narine Arakelian is a member of the Russian Union of Artists.

Early life and education 
Narine Arakelian was born on 13 May 1979 in Tynda, Siberia. In 2015 she graduated from the State Surikov Institute (Moscow).

Arakelian has participated in a number of international art shows and exhibitions. Since 2015 her artworks were exhibited in international shows within 56th Venice Biennale (2015), 57th Venice Biennale (2017) and 58th International Art Exhibition, La Biennale di Venezia (2019), Manifesta XII in Palermo (2018), as well as she had a series of solo and group exhibitions in Moscow, Berlin, Miami and Los Angeles.

Major Artworks 
The “Stigmata” Painting (2015)

The “L’Illusion du Marriage” Performance Art (2017)

The "Love is…” Performance Art (2017)

The "Honeymoon” Performance Art (2017)

The "Decommodification Principle” Video Art (2017)

The “Hope” Canvas (2018)

The “Cast Iron Pots and Pans” Public Intervention Art (2019)

The “Lighthouse” Environmental Art (2019)

The “Bloom” Performance Art (2019)

The "Initiation” Installation Art (2019)

The "Rebirth Subconscious” Video Art (2019)

The "Love&Hope” AR Performance Art - LoveXXL360 (2020)

The "Paradise Apple”  AR Performance Art - LoveXXL360 (2020)

External links 
 Official website

References 

Video artists
People from Tynda
Russian people of Armenian descent
1979 births
Living people